Ranakpur Jain temple or Chaturmukha Dharana Vihara is a Śvētāmbara Jain temple at Ranakpur dedicated to Tirthankara Rishabhanatha. The temple is located in a village of Ranakpur near Sadri town in the Pali district of Rajasthan.

Darna Shah, a local Jain businessperson, started construction of the temple in the 15th century following a divine vision. The temple honours Adinath, the first Tirthankar of the present half-cycle (avasarpiṇī) according to Jain cosmology. The Ranakpur temple is one of the largest and most important temples of Jain culture. The campus includes various temples such as Chaumukha temple, Surya temple, Suparshvanatha temple and Amba temple.

Ranakpur along with Muchhal Mahavir, Narlai, Nadol and Varkana forms "Gorwad Panch Tirth".

Temple History 

The construction is well documented in a 1436 CE copper-plate record, inscriptions in the temple and a Sanskrit text Soma-Saubhagya Kavya. Inspired by a dream of a celestial vehicle, Dharna Shah, a Porwal from Ghanerao, commenced its construction in 1389, under the patronage of Rana Kumbha, then ruler of Mewar. The architect who oversaw the project was named Dwepa.  There is an inscription on a pillar near the main shrine stating that in 1439 Deepaka, an architect, constructed the temple at the direction of Dharanka, a devoted Jain. When the ground floor was completed, Acharya Soma Sundar Suri of Tapa Gaccha supervised the ceremonies, which are described in Soma-Saubhagya Kavya. The construction continued until 1458 CE. However, according to the audio guide provided to visitors to the site, construction lasted fifty years (and involved 2785 workers). Another source reports that construction continued until 1496, fifty years from 1446. The town of Ranakpur and the temple are named after the provincial ruler monarch, Rana Kumbha who supported the construction of the temple.

Architecture 

Whilst Dilwara temples are known for their sculptural work, this temple is famous for its  intricate carvings and unique architecture. It was built in the form of Nalini-Gulma Vimana(a heavenly vehicle Dharna Shah saw in his dreams). This temple is built in Māru-Gurjara architecture.

The temple has a garbhagriha in which the main Chaumukha Adinatha idol is placed. The four openings of the sanctum lead to rangamandapa— the Dancing hall, which is connected to a two-storeyed mandapa, which is again connected to another two-storeyed mandapa called Balana and nalimandapa. This courtyard is surrounded by a wall enclosing sub-shrines. The wall is also exclusive on projections like devakulikas and minor deity. The temple has five shikharas amongst which the central one is the largest. The temple is rich with sculptural pieces - carvings created with great skill and artistry.

The Shikhara in the temple is symbolic of Mount Meru, the mountain which forms the axis of Jambudvipa with a preaching hall as the Samavasarana.

Main temple 

Chaturmukha temple is a 15th-century temple dedicated to Adinatha built using white marble in the midst of a forest. The temple name is credited to its design of chaumukha— with four faces. The construction of the temple and quadrupled image symbolise the Tirthankara's conquest of the four cardinal directions and hence the cosmos. The temple is one of the largest Jain temples and considered one of the five holiest Jain shrines in India and part of Gorwad Panch Tirth. The architecture and stone carvings of the temple are based on the Ancient Mirpur Jain Temple at Mirpur in Rajasthan.

One pillar is incomplete and legend says every time it is built the next morning the pillar breaks down again. The temple, with its distinctive domes, shikhara, turrets and cupolas rises majestically from the slope of a hill. The 1444 marble pillars, carved in exquisite detail, support the temple. The pillars individually carved and no two pillars are the same. Legend says that it is impossible to count the pillars. One of the pillar bares the carving mother of a tirthankar lying on a cot. In the axis of the main entrance, on the western side, is the largest image. Inside the garbhagriha, the moolnayak of this temple, there is a 6-ft. tall, white-coloured chaumukha idol of Adinath with four heads facing in four direction. Temple has a total of 84 bhonyra (underground chambers) built to protect the Jain idols from the Mughals.

The temple is famous for its beautiful carved idol of Parshvanatha  made out of a single marble slab. The idol has 1008 snake heads and numerous tails. Two chauri bearers and Yaksha and yakshi, half-human and half-snake, stand on either side. There are two elephants purifying Parshvanatha. One cannot find the end of the tails. The temple also has a representation of Ashtapad, showing eight tirthanakars in a row, Girnar and Nandishwar Dvipa.

The design of the temple inspired Pittalhar temple, Dilwara in 1459 CE and in the Palitana temple complex in 1681.

Other temples 

 Parshvanatha temple 
A temple dedicated to Suparshvanatha is also present here. The temple has an intrinsic design and this temple is also famous for erotic arts on the wall.

 Neminatha temple 
There is a temple dedicated to Neminatha with exquisite carvings.

 Mahavir temple
This is a 17th century Jain temple dedicated to Mahavira. The temple features a massive dome structure with highly decorated pillars and ceiling.

 Sun temple 
The sun temple at Ranakpur dates back to the 13th century CE. After its destruction, it was rebuilt in the 15th century. This temple is managed by Udaipur royal family trust.

Management 

The temple underwent periodic renovations. Several families supported the construction of devakulikas and mandaps. The descendants of Darna Shah now mainly live in Ghanerao. The temple has been managed by the Anandji Kalyanji Pedhi trust for the past century. The temple has a dharmshala, bhojnalya and club. The trust also maintains a secondary school and Vijya Shanti Shiksha Bhawan.

Campaign to reclaim the ownership

In 1950, the government declared the area near the temple as a Reserve Forest and considered the Ranakpur Temple being included in the sanctuary.
In 1998, the government declared the area under Kumbhalgarh Wildlife Sanctuary and considered the inclusion of the temple complex within the sanctuary. When the matter was placed before Central Empowered Committee (CEC) which was constituted by the Supreme Court of India, Anandji Kalyanji Trust (AKT) accepted the temple complex to be part of the reserve forest and wildlife sanctuary. It was held that the trust is only to have permissive possession over the temple complex.

Reclaim Ranakpur is a movement by the Jain sect to regain their ownership rights on the Ranakpur Jain Temple currently under the forest department of the State. 
The Memorandum states - ‘This Jain Tirth is included in the forest under various forest laws, years ago. Both the tirth complexes have been in existence long before the forest laws came into being. However despite this, the State government did not deem it necessary to keep the tirth complexes out of the forest. Adding to this, the Sheth Anandji Kalyanji Trust ("AKT"), which is only a managing body of this tirth, has unauthorisedly accepted that the complex belongs to the forest department of the State without taking consent of the entire community. This has deprived Shree Sangh to own its significant and prestigious places of worship.’

The Memorandum also claims - ‘No information was ever passed to the Jain Community (Shree Sangh), through any public notice or otherwise, regarding the circumstances of the Tirth in past decades.’ Therefore, the movement includes an awareness and signature campaign addressed to the relevant government authorities requesting that the assent given by AKT be not considered on behalf of the entire Jain Community (Shree Sangh), the real owner, and accordingly rectification be made in relation to the ownership of Shree Sangh over Ranakpur Tirth.

Picture gallery

See also 

 Dilwara Temples
 Nagarparkar Jain Temples
 Jainism in Rajasthan
 Kesariyaji

Nearest Railhead 
Falna is the most convenient Railway Station, around 35 km from The Ranakpur Jain Temple. Rani is around 39 km from the Ranakpur Temple.

References

Citation

Sources

Book

Web

External links 
 Seven Wonders of India: Ranakpur Jain Temples

Jain architecture
Jain art
Jain temples in Rajasthan
Tourist attractions in Pali district
Jain pilgrimage sites
15th-century Jain temples
Māru-Gurjara architecture
Rajput architecture